Vanessa Lengies (born July 21, 1985) is a Canadian actress, dancer and singer. She is known for starring in the drama American Dreams as Roxanne Bojarski. She appeared as Charge Nurse Kelly Epson on the TNT medical drama HawthoRNe, and has appeared in the recurring role of Sugar Motta in the third, fourth, and sixth seasons of the Fox series Glee. In 2021, Lengies played Erica on Turner & Hooch.

Early life
Lengies was born in Montreal, Quebec, Canada, to a German father and an Egyptian mother. She grew up in Hudson, Quebec, where she graduated from Hudson High School in 2002.

Career
Lengies got her start in Canadian television on shows such as Sponk!, Are You Afraid of the Dark?, Radio Active, and Popular Mechanics for Kids. Her voice was lent to Emily on the PBS animated series Arthur. In 2000, she had the lead role in the Showtime film Ratz.

In 2002, she was cast as a series regular in the NBC comedy-drama American Dreams, playing teenager Roxanne Bojarski. The show was set in Philadelphia in the mid-1960s, and Roxanne becomes one of the dancers on the American Bandstand television show hosted by Dick Clark. The series ran for three seasons, with the final episode broadcast in March 2005.

In August 2005, she co-starred with Hilary Duff and Heather Locklear in the comedy The Perfect Man. She also plays a supporting role as the jailbait hostess, Natasha, in the 2005 American film Waiting..., and reprised the role in the film's 2009 sequel, Still Waiting.... In 2006, she co-starred with Jeff Bridges and Missy Peregrym as a gymnast in the film Stick It.

For The Grudge 2, the role of Vanessa was originally written for Lengies, who eventually turned it down to film My Suicide; the part still bears her name. She has also appeared in CBS show Ghost Whisperer in an episode titled "The Vanishing" and the NBC show Medium in the episode "Apocalypse... Now?". She made another appearance in an episode of the short-lived CBS show Moonlight.

Lengies was seen as Sophia in the Lifetime original drama series Monarch Cove. She also co-starred in the ABC online comedy Squeegees.

She appeared as Nurse Kelly Epson on the TNT medical drama Hawthorne from 2009 through 2011. The role was a recurring one for the first season, and Lengies became a series regular for the following two seasons. The show, which ran for three seasons of ten episodes starting each June, was not renewed for a fourth summer. She appeared in the role of Loco Uno in an online mockumentary and sitcom called MyMusic.

She was cast as Kacey, a bubbly cocktail waitress, in the sitcom Mixology. However, ABC canceled Mixology after only one season. Originally cast in a guest role, Lengies was upped to a main cast role on FOX's 2016 drama Second Chance (earlier titled Lookinglass).

Glee
In August 2011, Lengies was cast in the recurring role of Sugar Motta for the third season of Glee. Sugar, who is well-off, self-confident, and has a tin ear, first appeared in the season premiere on September 20, 2011. Since then, Sugar's singing has greatly improved, and she now performs with the main glee club, New Directions; she had her first solo line in the season's tenth episode, "Yes/No". In 2013, Lengies visited her old high school to see how much it had changed, and to speak to the Student Life and Drama students about her journey of how she got to be on Glee.

According to Lengies, Sugar's self-diagnosed Aspergers is part of her character. She said that it was difficult to sing poorly on purpose, especially with piano accompaniment. Sugar's debut was praised by Salon Matt Zoller Seitz, who said of the new addition to McKinley, "She's awful. She's also an entitled little snot... She's a great character, and I hope we haven't seen the last of her." Entertainment Weekly Abby West praised Sugar, and with Sue otherwise occupied hoped to see more of Sugar as "a thorn in the Glee club's side". On the other hand, TV Guide "jeered" Sugar, calling her "an off-key addition to the cast". The A.V. Club Emily VanDerWerff concurred, and said of "I Am Unicorn", "Sugar continues to be one of my least favorite new characters in ages". The Huffington Post named Sugar Motta one of the "Worst TV Characters" in 2012. Respers France was entirely unimpressed with the routine. For her, Sugar's scene following it was one of the episode's few highlights, although she described Sugar as having "a horrible voice".

Following the end of the fourth season, Lengies announced her departure from Glee, citing frustration with not having the opportunity to act as she was hired per episode, though she did return for two appearances in the sixth season.

Personal life
She came out as genderfluid and bisexual on her own documentary series The 'S' Word with Vanessa Lengies in 2017.

Filmography

Awards and nomination

Discography 

 Glee: The Music Presents Glease

Singles

References

External links
 

1985 births
Living people
20th-century Canadian actresses
21st-century Canadian actresses
Actresses from Montreal
Anglophone Quebec people
Bisexual actresses
Canadian child actresses
Canadian expatriate actresses in the United States
Canadian women singers
Canadian film actresses
Canadian people of Egyptian descent
Canadian people of German descent
Canadian television actresses
Canadian voice actresses
Canadian web series actresses
Canadian LGBT actors
Singers from Montreal
Canadian LGBT singers
Genderfluid people
21st-century Canadian LGBT people
20th-century Canadian LGBT people